Fifty Fifty  is an Israeli comedy film directed by Boaz Davidson and produced by Assi Dayan and Moshe Golan.

Plot
"Fifty fifty" is a comedy that takes place in Tel Aviv during the early 1970s. Grossman is a bakery owner who wins the lottery, however, he holds only half of the winning ticket. The other half is in the possession of his partner Levi, who dies unexpectedly. The plot gets complicated when two crooks break and settle in Levi's apartment.

Cast
  as Grossman (The baker)
  as Ezra, Grossman's nephew
 Aliza Itzhaki as Leo Levi's daughter
  as Leo Levi's son-in-low
 Assi Dayan as the first thief
 Baruch David as the second thief
 Nahum Buchman as the manager of the automated bakery
  as the son of the manager
 Zvi Shissel as the other son of the manager

Soundtrack
A five-song Extended play was issued for the film containing the three songs that were sung in the films, two by Arik Einstein and one by Assi Dayan, and two accompanying tracks. The EP wasn't reissued since in any format, although the two Arik Einstein songs were reprinted in some compilation albums and on the 2018 Arik Einstein rare recordings collection "VeOd Lo Amarti HaKol" (And I Yet to Say It All).

Track listing
Side A
 "Leo HaTov" (Good Leo) – Arik Einstein (4:51)
 "Al Tagid Mila" (Don't Say a Word) – Assi Dayan (3:40)

Side B
 "Lo Al HaHetzi Levado" (Not By the Half Only) – Arik Einstein (3:01)
 "Same'ach BaMa'afiya" (Merry in the Bakery) – David Kriboshe (2:47)
 "Ne'imat Hetzi Hetzi" (Fifty Fifty Theme) – Gali Atari (2:00)

See also
 Cinema of Israel

References

External links
Fifty Fifty in IMDb
Hetzi Hetzi in Book of Israeli Cinema site

1971 films
1971 comedy films
Films set in the 1970s
Israeli comedy films
Films directed by Boaz Davidson
Films set in Tel Aviv
1970s Hebrew-language films
Films with screenplays by Boaz Davidson